In the mathematical field of analysis, uniform convergence is a mode of convergence of functions stronger than pointwise convergence.

The difference between uniform convergence and pointwise convergence was not fully appreciated early in the history of calculus, leading to instances of faulty reasoning.  The concept, which was first formalized by Karl Weierstrass, is important because several properties of the functions , such as continuity, Riemann integrability, and, with additional hypotheses, differentiability, are transferred to the limit  if the convergence is uniform, but not necessarily if the convergence is not uniform.

History 

In 1821 Augustin-Louis Cauchy  published a proof that a convergent sum of continuous functions is always continuous, to which Niels Henrik Abel in 1826 found purported counterexamples in the context of Fourier series, arguing that Cauchy's proof had to be incorrect.  Completely standard notions of convergence did not exist at the time, and Cauchy handled convergence using infinitesimal methods.  When put into the modern language, what Cauchy proved is that a uniformly convergent sequence of continuous functions has a continuous limit. The failure of a merely pointwise-convergent limit of continuous functions to converge to a continuous function illustrates the importance of distinguishing between different types of convergence when handling sequences of functions.

The term uniform convergence was probably first used by Christoph Gudermann, in an 1838 paper on elliptic functions, where he employed the phrase "convergence in a uniform way" when the "mode of convergence" of a series  is independent of the variables  and  While he thought it a "remarkable fact" when a series converged in this way, he did not give a formal definition, nor use the property in any of his proofs.

Later Gudermann's pupil Karl Weierstrass, who attended his course on elliptic functions in 1839–1840, coined the term gleichmäßig konvergent which he used in his 1841 paper Zur Theorie der Potenzreihen, published in 1894. Independently, similar concepts were articulated by Philipp Ludwig von Seidel and George Gabriel Stokes.  G. H. Hardy compares the three definitions in his paper "Sir George Stokes and the concept of uniform convergence" and remarks: "Weierstrass's discovery was the earliest, and he alone fully realized its far-reaching importance as one of the fundamental ideas of analysis."

Under the influence of Weierstrass and Bernhard Riemann this concept and related questions were intensely studied at the end of the 19th century by Hermann Hankel, Paul du Bois-Reymond, Ulisse Dini, Cesare Arzelà and others.

Definition 

We first define uniform convergence for real-valued functions, although the concept is readily generalized to functions mapping to metric spaces and, more generally, uniform spaces (see below). 

Frequently, no special symbol is used, and authors simply write 

 

to indicate that convergence is uniform.

.

In yet another equivalent formulation, if we define 

Symbolically, 

.

The sequence  is said to be locally uniformly convergent with limit  if  is a metric space and for every , there exists an  such that  converges uniformly on  It is clear that uniform convergence implies local uniform convergence, which implies pointwise convergence.

Notes 

Note that interchanging the order of quantifiers in the definition of uniform convergence by moving "for all " in front of "there exists a natural number " results in a definition of pointwise convergence of the sequence. Thus uniform convergence implies pointwise convergence, however the converse is not true, as the example in the section below illustrates.

Generalizations 

The most general setting is the uniform convergence of nets of functions E → X, where X is a uniform space.

Definition in a hyperreal setting
Uniform convergence admits a simplified definition in a hyperreal setting.

Examples 
For , a basic example of uniform convergence can be illustrated as follows: the sequence  converges uniformly, while  does not. Specifically, assume .

Given a topological space X, we can equip the space of bounded real or complex-valued functions over X with the uniform norm topology, with the uniform metric defined by 

Then uniform convergence simply means convergence in the uniform norm topology: 

.

The sequence of functions  

 

is a classic example of a sequence of functions that converges to a function  pointwise but not uniformly.

 

For  and given , we can ensure that  whenever  by choosing  (here the upper square brackets indicate rounding up, see ceiling function). Hence,  pointwise for all . These observations preclude the possibility of uniform convergence.

Since 

In fact, it is easy to see that

contrary to the requirement that  if .

In this example one can easily see that pointwise convergence does not preserve differentiability or continuity. While each function of the sequence is smooth, that is to say that for all n, the limit  is not even continuous.

Exponential function 
The series expansion of the exponential function can be shown to be uniformly convergent on any bounded subset  using the Weierstrass M-test.

Theorem (Weierstrass M-test).

The complex exponential function can be expressed as the series:

Any bounded subset is a subset of some disc  of radius  centered on the origin in the complex plane. The Weierstrass M-test requires us to find an upper bound  on the terms of the series, with  independent of the position in the disc:

To do this, we notice

and take 

If  is convergent, then the M-test asserts that the original series is uniformly convergent.

The ratio test can be used here:

Thus the original series converges uniformly for all  and since , the series is also uniformly convergent on

Properties 

 Every uniformly convergent sequence is locally uniformly convergent.
 Every locally uniformly convergent sequence is compactly convergent.
 For locally compact spaces local uniform convergence and compact convergence coincide.
 A sequence of continuous functions on metric spaces, with the image metric space being complete, is uniformly convergent if and only if it is uniformly Cauchy.

Applications

To continuity

The following result states that continuity is preserved by uniform convergence:

This theorem is proved by the " trick", and is the archetypal example of this trick: to prove a given inequality, one uses the definitions of continuity and uniform convergence to produce 3 inequalities, and then combines them via the triangle inequality to produce the desired inequality.

This theorem is an important one in the history of real and Fourier analysis, since many 18th century mathematicians had the intuitive understanding that a sequence of continuous functions always converges to a continuous function.  The image above shows a counterexample, and many discontinuous functions could, in fact, be written as a Fourier series of continuous functions.  The erroneous claim that the pointwise limit of a sequence of continuous functions is continuous (originally stated in terms of convergent series of continuous functions) is infamously known as "Cauchy's wrong theorem".  The uniform limit theorem shows that a stronger form of convergence, uniform convergence, is needed to ensure the preservation of continuity in the limit function.

More precisely, this theorem states that the uniform limit of uniformly continuous functions is uniformly continuous; for a locally compact space, continuity is equivalent to local uniform continuity, and thus the uniform limit of continuous functions is continuous.

To differentiability
If  is an interval and all the functions  are differentiable and converge to a limit , it is often desirable to determine the derivative function  by taking the limit of the sequence . This is however in general not possible: even if the convergence is uniform, the limit function need not be differentiable (not even if the sequence consists of everywhere-analytic functions, see Weierstrass function), and even if it is differentiable, the derivative of the limit function need not be equal to the limit of the derivatives. Consider for instance  with uniform limit . Clearly,  is also identically zero. In order to ensure a connection between the limit of a sequence of differentiable functions and the limit of the sequence of derivatives, the uniform convergence of the sequence of derivatives plus the convergence of the sequence of functions at at least one point is required:

To integrability
Similarly, one often wants to exchange integrals and limit processes. For the Riemann integral, this can be done if uniform convergence is assumed:
 If  is a sequence of Riemann integrable functions defined on a compact interval   which uniformly converge with limit , then  is Riemann integrable and its integral can be computed as the limit of the integrals of the : 
In fact, for a uniformly convergent family of bounded functions on an interval, the upper and lower Riemann integrals converge to the upper and lower Riemann integrals of the limit function.

Much stronger theorems in this respect, which require not much more than pointwise convergence, can be obtained if one abandons the Riemann integral and uses the Lebesgue integral instead.

To analyticity
Using Morera's Theorem, one can show that if a sequence of analytic functions converges uniformly in a region S of the complex plane, then the limit is analytic in S. This example demonstrates that complex functions are more well-behaved than real functions, since the uniform limit of analytic functions on a real interval need not even be differentiable (see Weierstrass function).

To series
We say that  converges:

With this definition comes the following result:
Let x0 be contained in the set E and each fn be continuous at x0. If  converges uniformly on E then f is continuous at x0 in E. Suppose that  and each fn is integrable on E. If  converges uniformly on E then f is integrable on E and the series of integrals of fn is equal to integral of the series of fn.

Almost uniform convergence
If the domain of the functions is a measure space E then the related notion of almost uniform convergence can be defined. In other words, almost uniform convergence means there are sets of arbitrarily small measure for which the sequence of functions converges uniformly on their complement.

Note that almost uniform convergence of a sequence does not mean that the sequence converges uniformly almost everywhere as might be inferred from the name. However, Egorov's theorem does guarantee that on a finite measure space, a sequence of functions that converges almost everywhere also converges almost uniformly on the same set.

Almost uniform convergence implies almost everywhere convergence and convergence in measure.

See also
Uniform convergence in probability
Modes of convergence (annotated index)
Dini's theorem
Arzelà–Ascoli theorem

Notes

References
 Konrad Knopp, Theory and Application of Infinite Series; Blackie and Son, London, 1954, reprinted by Dover Publications, .
 G. H. Hardy, Sir George Stokes and the concept of uniform convergence; Proceedings of the Cambridge Philosophical Society, 19, pp. 148–156 (1918)
 Bourbaki; Elements of Mathematics: General Topology. Chapters 5–10 (paperback); 
 Walter Rudin, Principles of Mathematical Analysis, 3rd ed., McGraw–Hill, 1976.
 Gerald Folland, Real Analysis: Modern Techniques and Their Applications, Second Edition, John Wiley & Sons, Inc., 1999, .
 William Wade,  An Introduction to Analysis, 3rd ed., Pearson, 2005

External links
 
 Graphic examples of uniform convergence of Fourier series from the University of Colorado

Calculus
Mathematical series
Topology of function spaces
Convergence (mathematics)